Roman Kreuziger (born 6 May 1986) is a Czech former professional road bicycle racer, who last rode for UCI ProTeam . His father, Roman Kreuziger Sr., was also a bicycle racer who won the Tour of Austria in 1991 and the Cyclocross Junior World Championships in 1983.

Kreuziger was an all-rounder, with climbing and time trial abilities, becoming a contender for the General classification of stage races. He is also considered one of the biggest talents of the sport after winning the 2004 Junior Road World Championships and the 2008 Tour de Suisse at the age of 22. Next year, he won the 2009 Tour de Romandie and in 2013, he was the victor of the Amstel Gold Race.

Career

Liquigas (2006–2010)
He turned professional in 2006 with Liquigas after a successful amateur career which saw him win the Junior Road World Championships in 2004 and a stage of the Giro delle Regioni in 2005. In 2007 he showed great improvements in his abilities by placing second in the prologues of Paris–Nice and the Tour de Romandie, where he also finished sixth overall. He took his first professional victory in the second stage of the Settimana Ciclistica Lombarda. In late 2007, he also completed his first Grand Tour after finishing 21st in the Vuelta a España.

In 2008 he finished second in the Tour de Romandie, 35 seconds behind Andreas Klöden, one of the world's leading riders. He avenged his loss by winning the Tour de Suisse by finishing 49 seconds ahead of Klöden and winning the mountain time trial to Klausen Pass. In his first Tour de France, he proved himself as an excellent climber among the world's greats, eventually finishing second in the youth competition, and 12th overall. After the Tour, Kreuziger was known to be one of the future riders to potentially win grand tours.

In 2009 he got back to the Tour de Romandie and finally succeeded in his attempt to win the race, getting also one stage victory. He added to this success by finishing in ninth place in the Tour de France.

In 2010 he won the Giro di Sardegna, finished third in Paris–Nice. Kreuziger's 9th overall in the Tour de France was a disappointment because it was not much of an improvement from his 9th-place finish in the 2009 Tour (though he would move into 8th after the Alberto Contador's stripped title).

Astana (2011–2012)

In 2011 Kreuziger won the mountains classification and a stage in the Giro del Trentino. He achieved a 4th-place finish in the Liège–Bastogne–Liège by winning the sprint of the chasing group, almost half-a-minute behind winner Philippe Gilbert. He then aimed for the Giro d'Italia. Kreuziger didn't quite have the uphill strength that Contador, Nibali, and Scarponi had, causing him to miss out on the podium. He ended up finishing 5th overall and he also won the young rider's classification.

In 2012 he finished third in the Tirreno–Adriatico. He entered the 2012 Giro d'Italia leading Team Astana with Paolo Tiralongo. He won the mountainous stage 19 after a solo breakaway but had a disappointing 15th overall finish.

Team Saxo–Tinkoff (2013–2016)

Kreuziger left  at the end of the 2012 season, and joined  on a three-year contract from the 2013 season onwards. In April 2013 he won the Amstel Gold Race. Kreuziger worked with doping doctor Michele Ferrari according to former teammate Leonardo Bertagnolli. When asked about the allegations after the Amstel Gold Race, Kreuziger refused to comment on the ties, saying he would address the topic after the Tour de Romandie. He did and he admitted working with Ferrari from the autumn of 2006 through 2007 but that he did not use banned drugs. After the Amstel Gold Race, Kreuziger finished 3rd in the Tour de Suisse after aiming to win it.

Despite riding the 2013 Tour to support Alberto Contador, Kreuziger left the Pyrenees 5th overall. After putting a solid time trial on stage 17, Kreuziger moved into the top three, moving ahead of Laurens ten Dam and Bauke Mollema. Despite moving into a high finish with Alberto Contador, Kreuziger slipped down to 5th overall after losing ground to Nairo Quintana and Joaquim Rodríguez in the alps.

In 2014, Kreuziger started his season finishing 8th in the Tour of Oman. He rode the Tirreno Adriatico in support of Alberto Contador though he finished 3rd overall with Contador winning the race. After, he rode through the Ardennes classics finishing in the top ten in the Fleche Wallonne and the Liege-Bastogne-Liege. He then finished 8th the Tour de Suisse.

In June 2014 Tinkoff-Saxo announced that Kreuziger was being temporarily suspended from racing after the UCI questioned abnormalities in his biological passport. The UCI had originally highlighted the problems in his biological data for the 2011 and 2012 seasons through a letter in June 2013, which Kreuziger had responded to in October 2013, even though the values did not get out of the biological passport range which determines what values the gained cyclist samples ought to have. The UCI subsequently followed this up in May 2014. This prevented Kreuziger from riding the Tour de France and Tour de Pologne. In August 2014 the Court of Arbitration for Sport rejected an appeal by Kreuziger to allow him to start the 2014 Vuelta a España. On 22 September, it was announced that the Czech Olympic Committee had cleared him of any anti-doping violation and that he was free to compete again. The UCI and the World Anti-Doping Agency appealed against the decision to the Court of Arbitration for Sport in October 2014. The case was dropped by both agencies on 5 June 2015. Kreuziger took part in the 2015 Tour de France, finishing in 17th place.

Orica–Scott (2017–2018) 
In August 2016,  announced the 'game-changing signing' of Kreuziger on a 2-year contract, ending at the end of the 2018 season.

Major results

Road

2003
 6th Time trial, UCI World Junior Championships
2004
 UCI World Junior Championships
1st  Road race
2nd  Time trial
 National Junior Championships
1st  Road race
1st  Time trial
 1st  Overall Grand Prix Rüebliland
 5th Overall Giro della Lunigiana
1st Stage 3b (ITT)
2005
 2nd Overall Giro delle Regioni
1st Stage 3
 8th Gran Premio Palio del Recioto
 10th Overall Giro della Toscana
2006
 9th Trofeo Città di Castelfidardo
 9th Gran Premio Industria e Commercio Artigianato Carnaghese
2007
 1st Trofeo Città di Borgomanero
 6th Overall Settimana Ciclistica Lombarda
1st Stages 1 (TTT) & 2
 6th Overall Tour de Romandie
2008
 1st  Overall Tour de Suisse
1st Stage 8 (ITT)
 2nd Overall Tour de Romandie
 7th Overall Tour of Missouri
1st  Mountains classification
 10th Overall Tour de Luxembourg
2009
 1st  Overall Tour de Romandie
1st  Young rider classification
1st Stage 4
 1st Clásica de San Sebastián
 3rd Overall Tour de Suisse
 7th UCI World Ranking
 8th Overall Tour de France
 10th Overall Tour of the Basque Country
2010
 1st  Overall Giro di Sardegna
1st Stage 2
 3rd Overall Paris–Nice
1st  Young rider classification
 5th Amstel Gold Race
 7th Overall Tour de France
 8th Overall Volta a Catalunya
2011
 Giro del Trentino
1st  Mountains classification
1st Stage 4
 4th Liège–Bastogne–Liège
 5th Overall Giro d'Italia
1st  Young rider classification
2012
 1st Stage 19 Giro d'Italia
 2nd Tour Bohemia
 3rd Overall Tirreno–Adriatico
 6th Overall Tour de Romandie
 6th Overall Tour de Suisse
 6th Overall Giro del Trentino
 6th Strade Bianche
2013
 1st Amstel Gold Race
 3rd Overall Tour de Suisse
 3rd Clásica de San Sebastián
 5th Overall Tour de France
 6th GP Miguel Induráin
2014
 3rd Overall Tirreno–Adriatico
 5th Strade Bianche
 7th Liège–Bastogne–Liège
 8th Overall Tour of Oman
 8th Overall Tour de Suisse
 8th La Flèche Wallonne
2015
 1st Stage 6 USA Pro Cycling Challenge
 5th Liège–Bastogne–Liège
 10th Overall Tirreno–Adriatico
2016
 1st  Road race, National Championships
 6th Overall Vuelta a Andalucía
 7th Liège–Bastogne–Liège
 10th Overall Tour de France
 10th Overall Tirreno–Adriatico
2017
 1st Pro Ötztaler 5500
 4th Road race, National Championships
2018
 2nd Amstel Gold Race
 4th La Flèche Wallonne
 6th Road race, UCI World Championships
 8th Overall Volta a la Comunitat Valenciana
 8th Liège–Bastogne–Liège

General classification results timeline

Classics results timeline

Cyclo-cross
2004
 2nd  UCI World Junior Championships
 2nd  UEC European Junior Championships

References

External links

 
 
 Palmares at Cycling Base (French)

Czech male cyclists
1986 births
Living people
Cyclists at the 2008 Summer Olympics
Cyclists at the 2012 Summer Olympics
Olympic cyclists of the Czech Republic
Tour de Suisse stage winners
People from Moravská Třebová
Czech Giro d'Italia stage winners
Sportspeople from the Pardubice Region